Mahatma Mandir is a convention and exhibition centre located at sector 13 C in Gandhinagar, Gujarat, India. It is inspired from life and philosophy of Mahatma Gandhi. It was developed by the Government of Gujarat. Business summits like Vibrant Gujarat Global Investor Summit 2011, 2013, 2015, 2017 and 2019 were organised here.

History
The Government of Gujarat wanted to develop Mahatma Mandir as a place of unity and development. Sand was brought in urns by representatives of all 18,066 villages of Gujarat and emptied in the foundation of the Mahatma Mandir. A time capsule was buried under Mahatma Mandir containing history of state in 2010 at the groundbreaking ceremony.

It was built by Larsen & Toubro (L&T) and Shapoorji Pallonji and Company Limited in two phases. The planning and design of the building is environment-friendly.

It includes a convention centre, three large exhibition halls and some small halls having conferencing facility.

Structures

Convention centre
A convention centre has column free air conditioned halls with capacity to accommodate over 15,000 people at a time. Its theatre style main hall have capacity of 6000 people. Exhibition halls are built over  area. It has four seminar halls (three having seating capacity of 500 and one with capacity of 1000), seven high tech conference halls and a meeting room. The Mahatma Mandir Convention and Exhibition Centre by The Leela draws inspiration from the life and philosophy of Mahatma Gandhi. Spread across 34 acres, it is one of the biggest state-of-art facility in India, uniquely designed to combine a sense of aesthetics, functionality and flexibility. The 20,000 sq.m. of Convention and Exhibition area has an abundance of natural light and airy spaces and is equipped with energy efficient lighting and waste water management. The Leela Gandhinagar which is expected to be completed by early 2019 will be a 300-room 5 star hotel built inside the complex.

Memorial
A memorial dedicated to Mahatma Gandhi was constructed by Shapoorji Pallonji And Company Limited. A suspension bridge is built in memory of the Dandi March. A concrete dome structure is constructed representing salt mound houses a museum, library and research center. A sculpture garden with stone murals depicting the life of Mahatma Gandhi is also developed. A grand spinning wheel, Charkha, is installed also.

Central vista
The  and  road connecting Mahatma Mandir and Gujarat Legislative Assembly building was constructed. It has three lanes on both side with gardens between them. It is a broadest avenue in Gujarat.

Controversies
Total 356 families of slum dwellers were displaced by the project which resulted in controversy. They were later provided new accommodation. Some Gandhians protested against the project arguing that it did not befit philosophy of Mahatma Gandhi.

References

External links
Video of Mahatma Mandir
About Mahatma Mandir
Mahatma Mandir Photos

Convention centres in India
Gandhinagar
Buildings and structures in Gujarat
Memorials to Mahatma Gandhi
Buildings and structures in Gandhinagar
2011 establishments in Gujarat
Buildings and structures completed in 2013